Tribhuwana Wijayatunggadewi, known in her regnal name Tribhuwannottunggadewi Jayawishnuwardhani, also known as Dyah Gitarja, was a Javanese queen regnant and the third Majapahit monarch, reigning from 1328 to 1350. She also bears the title Bhre Kahuripan (Duchess of Kahuripan). With the help of her prime minister Gajah Mada, she pursued a massive expansion of the empire. Tradition mentioned her as a woman of extraordinary valour, wisdom and intelligence.

Early life 
Dyah Gitarja was the first daughter of Kertarajasa Jayawardana, the founder of Majapahit Empire and his high rank consort Dyah Gayatri who held the title Rajapatni. She also the member of the famous Rajasa dynasty. From her mother's side, she was a granddaughter of Kertanagara, the last ruler of Singhasari.

She was the eldest of Wijaya's offspring, her younger sister namely Dyah Wiyat, both were the daughters of Rajapatni, while her half-brother was Jayanagara, the son of Indreswari. According to Nagarakretagama canto 48 stanza 1, her half-brother Jayanegara succeeded to the throne upon the death of her father in 1309, while she and her sister gained the title of Bhre Kahuripan (Duchess of Kahuripan) or Bhre Jivana and Bhre Daha (Duchess of Daha) respectively.

According to the Pararaton, King Jayanegara desired his half-sisters to be his consorts. The practice of half-sibling marriage is abhorred in Javanese tradition, subsequently the council of royal elders led by the Queen Dowager Gayatri spoke strongly against the king's wishes. The motivation of Jayanegara's wish was not clear — it might have been his way to ensure his throne's legitimacy by preventing rivals from his half sisters' suitors.

Nevertheless, Jayanegara went further to prevent his half-sisters' courtship by confining Gitarja and Wiyat in the kaputren (ladies quarter) of the palace, locking them in a well-guarded inner compound, and denying the two princesses contact and access to the court and public affairs. This confinement went on for years until both princesses grew mature and passed their suitable age for marriage in Javanese tradition. This alarmed their mother, the Queen Dowager Gayatri, who desperately tried to free her daughters from captivity.

Marriage 
She and his sister married right after the death of Jayanagara. She married Cakradhara, later known as Shri Kertavardhana, Duke of Tumapel. They had two child, Dyah Hayam Vuruk and Dyah Nertaja. While his sister, Wiyat married Kudamerta, later known as Shri Vijayarajasa, Duke of Wengker, herself brought the title Rajadevi Maharajasa, Duchess of Daha.

Reign 
According to Nagarakretagama, Gitarja came to the throne by the order of her mother Gayatri in 1329, replacing Jayanegara, who was murdered in 1328. A theory suspected that Gajah Mada was the mastermind behind the assassination, as Gajah Mada was the loyal and trusted advisor for Queen mother Rajapatni who sought to liberate her daughters from Jayanegara's captivity. By that time, Rajapatni Gayatri was the last surviving elder and matriarch of Majapahit royal family, and supposed to secure the throne since Jayanegara had no sons. But she had entered a convent, and had her daughter placed upon the throne.

Princess Gitarja ascended to throne under her new regnal name Tribhuwannottunggadewi Jayawishnuwardhani, which means "The exalted goddess of three worlds which the glory of Vishnu radiates". Tribhuwana governed with the help of her spouse, Kritavardhana.
She became the mother and predecessor to Hayam Wuruk, the fourth monarch of the Majapahit empire.

In 1331, she led the army herself to the battlefield with the help of her cousin, Adityawarman, to crush rebellion in the areas of Sadeng and Keta. The decision was partly to resolve the competition between Gajah Mada and Ra Kembar for the army general position to crush Sadeng. In 1334, she appointed Gajah Mada as her new Mahapatih (Javanese title equal to Prime Minister), and Gajah Mada proclaimed his famed Palapa oath, asserting his intention to expand the influence of the kingdom across the archipelago. According to Pararaton, his extraordinary vow surprised the court and state officials who attended his inauguration. Some of them, especially Mada's rival, Ra Kembar, laughed and mocked Mada, ridiculed him as a big-mouthed bluff with an impossible dream. This public humiliation enraged Gajah Mada, resulting in a duel, warranted by Tribhuwana, which led to the death of Ra Kembar and the execution of others that opposed his authority.

With the help of Gajah Mada as prime minister, Tribhuwana pursued a massive expansion of the empire. In 1343 Majapahit conquered the Kingdom of Pejeng, Dalem Bedahulu and the entire island of Bali. Adityawarman was sent to conquer the rest of the Kingdom of Srivijaya and the Melayu Kingdom in 1347. He was then promoted as uparaja (lower king) of Sumatra. Majapahit expansion continued under the reign of Hayam Wuruk, reaching Lamuri (present-day Aceh) in the West and Wanin (Onin Peninsula, Papua) in the East.

Later life 

Tribhuwana's reign ended as her mother Gayatri Rajapatni died in her retirement at a Buddhist monastery in 1350. Because she ruled Majapahit under Rajapatni's auspices to represent her, Queen Tribhuwana had to abdicate, and was obliged to relinquish her throne to her son. After her abdication, Tribhuwana did not retire completely, she was still actively involved in state affairs. During the reign of her son, King Hayam Wuruk, she was appointed for the second time as the Bhre Kahuripan, the ruler of Kahuripan coastal country, which was a Majapahit vital port during that time. She also became the member of Bhattara Saptaprabhu, the council of royal elders who offered advice to the king.

Tribhuwana died later in her retirement residence in Majapahit. A grand royal mortuary Hindu cremation ceremony ensued. She was posthumously deified as Parvati in Rimbi temple, East Java. In Javanese devaraja culture, the monarch is believed to be the incarnation of a certain god, and after death their soul is believed to be united with that god, and revered as such in a temple, dedicated for the departed soul of the monarch.

In popular culture
Tribhuwana appears as downloadable content for the 4X video game Civilization VI, where she leads the Indonesian civilization, and is referred to by her birth name of Gitarja.
Her leader bonus, Exalted Goddess of the Three Worlds, is the translation of her regnal name.

References

Bibliography 
 
 
 
 

Queens of Majapahit
Queens regnant in Asia
Indonesian Hindu monarchs
Javanese monarchs
14th-century women rulers
Women in 14th-century warfare
Women in war in Indonesia
14th-century monarchs in Asia
Monarchs who abdicated
Hinduism and women
14th-century Indonesian women
14th-century Hindus